Sand Mountain is a summit in Chester County, Tennessee with an elevation of .

Sand Mountain is covered with a sandy soil, hence the name. The primary coordinates for Sand Mountain places it within the TN 38332 ZIP Code delivery area.

References

Landforms of Chester County, Tennessee
Mountains of Tennessee